Peter Sykes, FRSC (19 February 1923 – 24 October 2003 ) was a British chemist and a former fellow and vice-master of Christ's College, Cambridge.

He is the author of the undergraduate-level organic chemistry textbook A Guidebook to Mechanism in Organic Chemistry.  A textbook on mechanistic organic chemistry, it is used all over the world for different competitive examinations.

References

1923 births
English chemists
Fellows of Christ's College, Cambridge
Fellows of the Royal Society of Chemistry
2003 deaths